
Brodnica County is a unit of territorial administration and local government (powiat) in Kuyavian-Pomeranian Voivodeship, north-central Poland. It came into being on January 1, 1999, as a result of the Polish local government reforms passed in 1998.

As of 2019 its total population is 78,935, out of which the population of Brodnica is 28,788, that of Jabłonowo Pomorskie is 3,754, that of Górzno is 1,366, and the rural population is 45,027.

The county includes part of the protected area known as Brodnica Landscape Park.

Neighbouring counties
Brodnica County is bordered by Nowe Miasto County to the north, Działdowo County and Żuromin County to the east, Rypin County to the south, Golub-Dobrzyń County to the south-west, and Wąbrzeźno County and Grudziądz County to the west.

Administrative division
The county is subdivided into 10 gminas (one urban, two urban-rural and seven rural). These are listed in the following table, in descending order of population.

References
 Polish official population figures 2019 

 
Brodnica